JJF may refer to:

 Jakarta International Java Jazz Festival, as a music festival
 Jumpin' Jack Flash, a song by the Rolling Stones